Johan Petro (born January 27, 1986) is a French former professional basketball player of Guadeloupean descent, who last played for the Sioux Falls Skyforce of the NBA Development League. He was selected by the SuperSonics with the 25th overall pick in the 2005 NBA draft.

He was a key member of the French junior national team and played at the INSEP. In 2004, he won the French League title with Pau-Orthez. Petro has also represented the French national basketball team.

Professional career

Seattle SuperSonics (2005–2009) 
Petro was selected with the 25th pick of the first round of the 2005 NBA Draft by the Seattle SuperSonics.

On March 30, 2007 Petro dropped a career high 22 points in a 120-93 victory over the Memphis Grizzlies.

On March 5, 2008 Petro grabbed a career high 15 rebounds in a 106-118 loss to the Milwaukee Bucks.

Unfortunately, the SuperSonics were not successful during this era as it was a stage of rebuilding the team after superstar Ray Allen left the team in 2007. Petro failed to make the playoffs with the SuperSonics, who later relocated to Oklahoma City and became the Oklahoma City Thunder in Petro's final season with the team during the 2008-2009 season.

Denver Nuggets (2009–2010) 
On January 7, 2009, Petro was traded to the Denver Nuggets along with a 2009 second round pick in exchange for guard Chucky Atkins, a conditional 2009 first round pick and cash considerations. The Nuggets declined Petro's team option, making him an unrestricted free agent. However, they resigned him on August 27, 2009. Petro was able to find team success with the Nuggets as Denver made the playoffs in 2009 and 2010 respectively. In the 2009 playoffs the Nuggets made it far, defeating the New Orleans Hornets and Dallas Mavericks in 5 games each in the first and second round, reaching the Western Conference Finals for the first time since 1985. They faced the Los Angeles Lakers led by Kobe Bryant, and fell to the Lakers in 6 games. That was the farthest Petro reached in the playoffs in his NBA career. The Nuggets reached the playoffs again in 2010 however they were disappointingly defeated in the first round by the Utah Jazz.

New Jersey Nets (2010–2012) 
On July 10, 2010, the New Jersey Nets signed Petro to a three-year deal worth $10 million, reported by Yahoo! Sports. Unfortunately the Nets were also facing a rebuild era just like with the SuperSonics/Thunder in the late 2000's, so Petro didn't reach the playoffs with the team.

On April 26, 2012, Petro scored the final ever points of the New Jersey Nets against the Toronto Raptors at Air Canada Centre.

Atlanta Hawks (2012–2013) 
On July 11, 2012, the Nets traded Petro, Jordan Farmar, Jordan Williams, Anthony Morrow, and DeShawn Stevenson to the Atlanta Hawks for Joe Johnson.

2013–present
In August 2013, he agreed to a one-year deal with Zhejiang Guangsha. He left them in January 2014.

In February 2014, he returned to France and signed with Limoges CSP. In June 2014, Petro announced that he would halt his career indefinitely to seek treatment for his back in Florida.

On January 28, 2015, Petro signed with Mets de Guaynabo of the Baloncesto Superior Nacional. On April 14, 2015, he was cut by the Puerto Rican club.

On February 2, 2016, he signed with Leones de Ponce. On February 24, 2017, Petro signed with the Sioux Falls Skyforce of the NBA Development League. On March 23, 2017, he was waived by the Skyforce.

National team career
Petro played with the senior men's French national basketball team at the 2006 FIBA World Championship. With France, he won the gold medal at the 2013 EuroBasket.

Personal life
Currently engaged to Daniela Cosma(Daza), has 3 boys Mason, Dylan, Jacob Petro

NBA career statistics

Regular season

|-
| align="left" | 
| align="left" | Seattle
| 68 || 41 || 18.9 || .510 || .000 || .627 || 4.4 || .2 || .4 || .8 || 5.2
|-
| align="left" | 
| align="left" | Seattle
| 81 || 13 || 18.6 || .516 || .000 || .649 || 4.1 || .6 || .5 || .6 || 6.2
|-
| align="left" | 
| align="left" | Seattle
| 72 || 28 || 18.2 || .419 || .000 || .736 || 5.1 || .4 || .5 || .6 || 6.0
|-
| align="left" | 
| align="left" | Oklahoma City
| 22 || 12 || 18.2 || .407 || .000 || .667 || 4.3 || .3 || .7 || .2 || 4.6
|-
| align="left" | 
| align="left" | Denver
| 27 || 10 || 8.1 || .429 || .000 || .429 || 2.3 || .4 || .1 || .4 || 2.2
|-
| align="left" | 
| align="left" | Denver
| 36 || 16 || 12.1 || .535 || .000 || .667 || 3.6 || .4 || .3 || .4 || 3.4
|-
| align="left" | 
| align="left" | New Jersey
| 77 || 1 || 11.6 || .445 || .000 || .536 || 2.8 || .6 || .4 || .4 || 3.5
|-
| align="left" | 
| align="left" | New Jersey
| 59 || 10 || 15.6 || .419 || 1.000 || .838 || 3.8 || .8 || .4 || .4 || 4.2
|-
| align="left" | 
| align="left" | Atlanta
| 31 || 8 || 11.4 || .436 || .250 || .917 || 3.6 || .5 || .3 || .3 || 3.5
|- class="sortbottom"
| style="text-align:center;" colspan="2"| Career
| 473 || 139 || 15.4 || .462 || .154 || .678 || 3.9 || .5 || .4 || .5 || 4.7

Playoffs

|-
| align="left" | 2009
| align="left" | Denver
| 10 || 0 || 2.6 || .222 || .000 || .625 || .6 || .1 || .0 || .1 || .9
|-
| align="left" | 2010
| align="left" | Denver
| 6 || 1 || 7.5 || .545 || .000 || .500 || 1.8 || .2 || .2 || .5 || 2.2
|-
| align="left" | 2013
| align="left" | Atlanta
| 6 || 4 || 16.8 || .519 || .000 || .500 || 3.7 || .7 || .2 || .7 || 4.8
|- class="sortbottom"
| style="text-align:center;" colspan="2"| Career
| 22 || 5 || 7.8 || .468 || .000 || .583 || 1.8 || .3 || .1 || .4 || 2.3

International stats

See also
 
 List of French NBA players
 List of European basketball players in the United States

References

External links

Asia-Basket.com Profile
Johan Petro Player Profile (InterBasket)

1986 births
Living people
2006 FIBA World Championship players
Basketball players from Paris
Black French sportspeople
Cangrejeros de Santurce basketball players
Centers (basketball)
Centre Fédéral de Basket-ball players
Denver Nuggets players
Élan Béarnais players
French expatriate basketball people in the United States
French men's basketball players
French people of Guadeloupean descent
Leones de Ponce basketball players
Limoges CSP players
National Basketball Association players from France
New Jersey Nets players
Oklahoma City Thunder players
Seattle SuperSonics draft picks
Seattle SuperSonics players
Sioux Falls Skyforce players
Zhejiang Lions players